Phyllodesmium jakobsenae is a species of sea slug, an aolid nudibranch, a marine gastropod mollusk in the family Facelinidae.

The specific name jakobsenae is in honor of diver and donor of marine slugs for research, Mrs. Wera Jakobsen.

Distribution 
The distribution of Phyllodesmium jakobsenae includes Bunaken Island, North Sulawesi, Indonesia and the Philippines.

Description 
This species contains zooxanthellae of the genus Symbiodinium in the digestive gland (hepatopancreas). It grows to 30 mm in length.

Ecology 
Phyllodesmium jakobsenae feeds on the soft coral Xenia.

References

Facelinidae
Gastropods described in 2004